Louis-Philippe Dalembert (born December, 1962 in Port-au-Prince, Haiti) is a Haitian poet and novelist. He writes in both French and Haitian creole. His works have been translated into several languages. He now divides his home between Paris and Port-au-Prince.

Life 
The son of a school teacher and principal, Louis-Philippe Dalembert was born in Port-au-Prince on December, 1962.  His father’s death, a few months later, drastically affected the economic situation of the family.  As a result, he spent his early childhood in the populous neighbourhood of Bel-Air, in a feminine universe.  With his mother needing to travel away during the week to teach in the countryside, he grew up surrounded by his mother’s cousins, his elder sister, his great-aunts and his maternal grandmother who controlled her family with the stick, in a Port-au-Prince that was run by the iron fisted François Duvalier, "Papa Doc".  At the age of six, he experienced the first great break of his life: his family moved away from that neighbourhood.  He drew on these formative very religious years lived under the sign of the sabbath to compose his novel Le crayon du bon Dieu n’a pas de gomme.

Port-au-Prince during the 1960s and 70's, was also all about outdoor cinemas, and in particular drive-ins.  One of these happened to be located right behind the new house, over the ravine.  In the evening, the entire neighbourhood would meet on the empty lot and watch the film.  Dalembert saw westerns, about which he is still mad, the first kung-fu films, and The Last Tango in Paris.  The problem was that they couldn’t hear anything.  They had to imagine the dialogue on their own, when of course someone didn’t play to the crowd with his own improvisations.  Telling from this time forth became for him above all else making one see.

Trained in literature and journalism, Dalembert worked first as a journalist in his homeland before leaving in 1986 for France where he obtained his PhD in comparative literature at the Sorbonne with a dissertation on the Cuban author, Alejo Carpentier, and a master in journalism from the Ecole Supérieure de Journalisme de Paris.  Since leaving Haiti, this polyglot vagabond (he juggles seven languages) has lived in Nancy, Paris, Rome, Jerusalem, Brazzaville, Kinshasa, Florence, and has traveled wherever his steps have taken him ... in the renewed echo of his native land.

His work carries the trace of his vagabonding [roaming] (a concept he prefers to that of errance [free-wheeling]) in its permanent tension between two periods (a childhood from which he continues to view the world, and adulthood) and two or more spaces. His works have been translated into several languages including Spanish, Italian, German, Danish, English and Serbo-croatian.

Today Dalembert lives in-between France and Haiti. He sporadically teaches in universities, such as the University of Wisconsin-Milwaukee, Freie Universität Berlin, University of Bern, and Sciences Po Paris as holder of the Writer-in-Residence Chair (2021). He is also known to be an avid soccer fan.

Works 
Novels and short stories
 Le Songe d’une photo d’enfance, short stories. Paris: Le Serpent à Plumes, 1993 ; Paris: Le Serpent à Plumes, 2005.
 Le crayon du bon Dieu n’a pas de gomme.  Paris: Stock, 1996 ; Paris: Le Serpent à Plumes, 2004. Port-au-Prince: Editions des Presses Nationales, 2006.
 L’Autre Face de la mer.  Paris: Stock, 1998 ; Paris : Le Serpent à Plumes, 2005. Port-au-Prince: Editions des Presses Nationales, 2007.
 L’Ile du bout des rêves.  Paris: Bibliophane/Daniel Radford, 2003. Paris : Le Serpent à Plumes, 2007.
 Rue du Faubourg Saint-Denis.  Monaco: Editions du Rocher, 2005.
 Les dieux voyagent la nuit.  Monaco: Editions du Rocher, 2006.
 Histoires d'amour impossibles... ou presque, short stories. Monaco: Éditions du Rocher, 2007.
 Noires blessures, Mercure de France, Paris, 2011.
 Les Bas-Fonds de la mémoire, short stories. Port-au-Prince, 2012
 Ballade d'un amour inachevé, Mercure de France, Paris, 2013 ; Port-au-Prince : C3 Éditions, 2014.
 Avant que les ombres s'effacent, Sabine Wespieser éditeur, Paris, 2017.
 Mur Méditerranée",Sabine Wespieser éditeur, Paris, 2019. 
 Milwaukee Blues, Sabine Wespieser éditeur, Paris, 2021.

In Haitian creole:
 Epi oun jou konsa tèt Pastè Bab pati, novel. Port-au-Prince: Editions des Presses Nationales, 2007.

Essay 
 Le Roman de Cuba, Éditions du Rocher, Monaco, 2009.
 Haïti, une traversée littéraire, en collaboration avec Lyonel Trouillot, Éditions Philippe Rey/Culturesfrance, Paris, 2010.

Poetry
 Evangile pour les miens.  Port-au-Prince: Choucoune, 1982.
 Et le soleil se souvient (followed by) Pages cendres et palmes d’aube.  Paris: L’Harmattan, 1989.
 Du temps et d'autres nostalgies.  Les Cahiers de la Villa Medicis 9.1 (1995): 24-38.
 Ces îles de plein sel. Vwa (La Chaux-de-fonds) 24 (1996): 151-171.
 Ces îles de plein sel et autres poèmes.  Ivry-sur-Seine: silex/Nouvelles du Sud, 2000.
 Dieci poesie (Errance).  Quaderni di via Montereale (Pordenone) 4 (2000).
 Poème pour accompagner l’absence.  Montréal: Mémoire d’encrier, 2005.
 Transhumances. Paris: Riveneuve éditions, 2010.
 En marche sur la terre, Paris: Éditions Bruno Doucey, 2017
 Cantique du balbutiement, Paris: Éditions Bruno Doucey, 2020
 Ces îles de plein sel et autres recueils, Paris: Éditions Points Poésie, 2021

 Translation into English 
 The Other Side of the Sea (translation by Robert H. McCormick Jr), novel, University of Virginia Press, Charlottesville and London, 2014.

 Prizes and awards 
 Grand Prix de poésie de la Ville d’Angers for the collection of poems Et le soleil se souvient: 1987.
 Resident at the Villa Médicis, Rome: 1994-95.
 Unesco/Aschberg Grant. Writer in residence at Mishkenot Sha’anamin, Jerusalem: 1997.
 Poncetton Grant, Société des Gens de Lettres, for L’Autre Face de la mer: 1998.
 Prix RFO du livre, for his novel L’Autre Face de la mer: 1999.
 Centre national du livre (CNL) Creation Grant for Rue du Faubourg Saint-Denis: 2003.
 French Institute of Tunisia Grant. Writer in residence in Tunis: 2006.
 Casa de las Américas Prize for his novel Les dieux voyagent la nuit: Cuba, 2008.
 DAAD Artists-in-Berlin Program guest : Berlin, 2010.
 Prix spécial "Ville de Limoges" for his novel Noires Blessures, Limoges, 2011.
 Best Essay 2011, Trophées des arts afro-caribéens for Haïti. Une traversée littéraire, Paris, 2011.
 Prix Thyde Monnier de la Société des gens de lettres for his novel Ballade d'un amour inachevé, Paris, 2013.
 Prix du jury de l'Algue d'Or for his novel Ballade d'un amour inachevé, Saint-Briac-sur-Mer, 2014.
 Prix Orange du Livre 2017 and Prix France Bleu/Page des libraires for his novel Avant que les ombres s'effacent Grand prix du roman de l'Académie française 2017 shortlist for his novel Avant que les ombres s'effacent Prix Médicis 2017 shortlist for his novel Avant que les ombres s'effacent Prix littéraire de Cenon, Prix du Jury 2018 for his novel Avant que les ombres s'effacent Prix Résidence d'auteur de la Fondation des Treilles 2018
 Prix de la langue française 2019 for his novel Mur Méditerranée Goncourt des Lycéens 2019 shortlist for his novel Mur Méditerranée Goncourt Choice of Poland 2019 for his novel Mur Méditerranée Goncourt Choice of Switzerland 2019 for his novel Mur Méditerranée''

External links 

 Presentation of the author (biography, bibliography, texts, interviews and audio extracts)
 Video of the author (biography, bibliography) : Ile en île and Dailymotion

Haitian male novelists
Haitian male poets
Haitian writers in French
Haitian Creole-language writers
20th-century Haitian novelists
20th-century Haitian poets
21st-century Haitian novelists
21st-century Haitian poets
1962 births
Living people
People from Port-au-Prince
20th-century male writers
21st-century male writers